In Greek mythology and legendary history, Callithyia (Ancient Greek: Καλλίθυια; also Callithoe (Καλλιθόη), Callithea (Καλλιθέα), or Io (Ἰώ ), "the best among women as well as among men", was an Argive princess as the daughter of King Peiras or Peiranthus (himself son of Argus) and the first priestess of Argive Hera in history.

Mythology 
Peiras was credited with founding the first temple of Hera in Argolis, as well as with carving a wooden image of the goddess for the sanctuary; it was at this temple that Callithyia performed her duties as priestess. Scholia on Aratus mention her as the inventor of the chariot and the mother of Trochilus.

Callithyia is perhaps identical with "Io Callithyessa", "the first priestess of Athena" according to Hesychius of Alexandria. In a lesser known version of the Argive genealogy, Io was the daughter of Peiren, likely the same as Peiras.

Notes

References 

 Apollodorus, The Library with an English Translation by Sir James George Frazer, F.B.A., F.R.S. in 2 Volumes, Cambridge, MA, Harvard University Press; London, William Heinemann Ltd. 1921. ISBN 0-674-99135-4. Online version at the Perseus Digital Library. Greek text available from the same website.
Hesiod, Catalogue of Women from Homeric Hymns, Epic Cycle, Homerica translated by Evelyn-White, H G. Loeb Classical Library Volume 57. London: William Heinemann, 1914. Online version at theio.com

Further reading

 Realencyclopädie der Classischen Altertumswissenschaft, Band X, Halbband 20, Ius Liberorum-Katochos (1920), s. 1750, u. Kallithoe 2)
 Lyons, Deborah. Gender and Immortality – Appendix: A Catalogue of Heroines, under Kallithyia
 West, M. L. (2003), Greek Epic Fragments: From the Seventh to the Fifth Centuries BC. Edited and translated by Martin L. West. Loeb Classical Library No. 497. Cambridge, Massachusetts: Harvard University Press, 2003.  . Online version at Harvard University Press.

Greek mythological priestesses
Princesses in Greek mythology
Inachids
Mythology of Argos
Hera